Juan José Luque de Serrallonga (31 May 1882 – 18 July 1967) was a Spanish-Mexican football goalkeeper and Coach.

He was also part of Sevilla FC in 1915 and 1916.

In July 1928, Luque de Serrallonga emigrated from Spain to Mexico. He became head coach of the Selección de fútbol de México (Mexico national team) in January 1930, and managed the team in the 1930 FIFA World Cup. Later, he was the coach of Mexican club CD Veracruz, winning the national championship in the 1949-50 season with them. He died in 1967 in Mexico City.

References

Further reading
  Biographic data at Cadiz CF supporter site

1882 births
1967 deaths
Spanish footballers
Mexican footballers
Cádiz CF players
Spanish football managers
Mexican football managers
C.D. Veracruz managers
1930 FIFA World Cup managers
Mexican people of Catalan descent
Spanish emigrants to Mexico
Sportspeople from Girona
Mexico national football team managers
Association football goalkeepers